"Brisé" (English: Shattered) is a song by Congolese-French singer and rapper Maître Gims from the album Mon cœur avait raison.

Charts

Weekly charts

Year-end charts

References 

2015 singles
2015 songs
Gims songs
French-language songs
Songs written by Renaud Rebillaud
Songs written by Gims